Malu Rocha (6 August 1947 – 7 June 2013) was a Brazilian actress.

Filmography

Film
 1972 - Geração em Fuga
 1977 - O Crime do Zé Bigorna
 1977 - Mágoa de Boiadeiro
 1979 - Bandido, Fúria do Sexo
 1984 - Como Salvar Meu Casamento

Television
 1975 - Pecado Capital as Cibele
 1982 - O Pátio das Donzelas
 1982 - O Homem Proibido
 1983 - Eu Prometo as Sônia
 2001 - Amor e Ódio as Ema Cortes
 2007 - Paraíso Tropical as Cely
 2007 - Sete Pecados
 2008 - Beleza Pura as Aracy
 2009 - Maysa: Quando Fala o Coração as Dona Rosa

Death 

She died on 7 June 2013 aged 65 from complications due to a disease that affects the nervous system, known as prion.

References

External links

1947 births
2013 deaths
People from Ourinhos
Brazilian film actresses
Brazilian television actresses